Cadillac Ranch may refer to:

 Cadillac Ranch, a 1974 outdoor sculpture built of Cadillac cars in Amarillo, Texas
 "Cadillac Ranch" (Bruce Springsteen song), a song by Bruce Springsteen and the E Street Band, first released on The River (1980)
 "Cadillac Ranch" (Chris LeDoux song), a song by Chris LeDoux, first released on Whatcha Gonna Do with a Cowboy (1992)
 Cadillac Ranch (film), a 1996 film produced by Chip Duncan